Mosbach-Neckarelz station is a railway station in the Neckarelz district of the municipality of Mosbach, located in the Neckar-Odenwald-Kreis in Baden-Württemberg, Germany.

References

Railway stations in Baden-Württemberg
Buildings and structures in Neckar-Odenwald-Kreis